Kire Grozdanov (born 18 December 1970) is a Macedonian retired football defender, who was last played for FK Pelister.

Club career
He played for Vardar in the 1994/95 Europa League and for Pelister in the 2001/02 Europa League.

International career
He made his senior debut for Macedonia in an October 1993 friendly match away against Slovenia, which was his country's first ever official match, and has earned a total of 7 caps, scoring no goals. His final international was a September 1998 friendly against Egypt.

References

External sources

1970 births
Living people
Sportspeople from Bitola
Association football defenders
Yugoslav footballers
Macedonian footballers
North Macedonia international footballers
FK Pelister players
FK Vardar players
FK Pobeda players
Yugoslav Second League players
Macedonian First Football League players
Macedonian Second Football League players